is a former Japanese football player.

Playing career
Koizumi was born in Yamanashi Prefecture on July 28, 1976. After graduating from Chuo University, he joined the newly promoted J2 League club, Ventforet Kofu based in his local area in 1999. On October 11, he debuted as a substitute in the 70th minute against Albirex Niigata. However he only played in that one match and retired at the end of the 1999 season.

Club statistics

References

External links

1976 births
Living people
Chuo University alumni
Association football people from Yamanashi Prefecture
Japanese footballers
J2 League players
Ventforet Kofu players
Association football midfielders